Řitka is a municipality and village in Prague-West District in the Central Bohemian Region of the Czech Republic. It has about 1,300 inhabitants.

Geography
Most of the municipality is located in the Hořovice Uplands, the southern part is located in the Brdy Highlands.

Transport
The D4 motorway runs south of the municipality.

Notable people
Wilhelm Weiss (1859–1904), mathematician
Lata Brandisová (1895–1981), aristocrat and equestrian; lived here

References

Villages in Prague-West District